The following is a list of the monastic houses in Buckinghamshire, England.

The following location in Buckinghamshire lacks known monastic connection:
Wycombe Abbey: Independent girls' school

See also
 List of monastic houses in England

Notes

References

Buckinghamshire
Buckinghamshire
Buckinghamshire
Lists of buildings and structures in Buckinghamshire